The Lithuania Baltic Cup 2010 football competition was held from 18 June to 20 June 2010 at the S. Darius and S. Girėnas Stadium in Kaunas, Lithuania.

Hosts Lithuania together with  Latvia and Estonia are the teams who played in this tournament.

Results

Winners

Statistics

Goalscorers

Under-21
The Under-21 tournament was played on the same dates as the main tournament, from 18 June to 20 June. Sūduva Sports Centre Stadium in Marijampolė hosted all three matches.

Results

Under-19
The tournament for under-19 teams was held from 25 June to 27 June in Palanga and Kretinga, at Palanga Stadium and Kretinga City Stadium respectively.

Results

Under-17
The tournament for under-17 teams was held from 25 June to 27 June in Palanga and Kretinga, at Palanga Stadium and Kretinga City Stadium respectively.

Results

See also
Balkan Cup
Nordic Football Championship

References

External links
 Baltic Cup 2010 overview
 2010 Baltic Cup on Futbolinis.lt

Baltic Cup (football)
Baltic Cup
Baltic Cup
Baltic Cup
International association football competitions hosted by Lithuania
Sport in Kretinga
Sport in Kaunas